William Thomas Greensmith (16 August 1930 – 15 July 2022) was a former English cricketer who played in 379 first-class matches, most of them for Essex, between 1947 and 1963. He was born in Middlesbrough, then in Yorkshire.

Greensmith played as an all-rounder: a right-handed batsman usually batting in the lower middle order, and a right-arm leg-spin and googly bowler. Without ever hitting the heights – he never scored 1000 runs in a season and nor did he ever take 100 wickets – he was an integral part of the Essex team from the start of the 1951 season through to 1963, when he was replaced in some games by Robin Hobbs and retired at the end of the season. After he retired from cricket he emigrated to Australia, where he lived until his death in 2022. At the time of his death he was Essex's oldest capped player. His daughter was fashion designer Melanie Greensmith.

References

1930 births
2022 deaths
English cricketers
Essex cricketers
Combined Services cricketers
Marylebone Cricket Club cricketers